Stonington Island is a rocky island lying  northeast of Neny Island in the eastern part of Marguerite Bay off the west coast of Graham Land, Antarctica. It was formerly connected by a drifted snow slope to Northeast Glacier on the mainland.

History
Stonington Island was chosen as the site for the East Base of the United States Antarctic Service (USAS) Expedition (1939–41). It was named after Stonington, Connecticut, home port of the sloop Hero in which Captain Nathaniel Palmer sighted the Antarctic continent in 1820.

Station E

The island was also home to the British Antarctic Survey (BAS) Station E and the Ronne Antarctic Research Expedition, and was the base of operations for many historic Antarctic Peninsula surveying missions in the 1940s. Station E was occupied until 23 February 1975 and the main building was known as Trepassey House, it was cleaned up and repaired in 1992. The huts are protected under the Antarctic Treaty.

Historic sites
A protected area on the island consists of the buildings and artifacts at East Base (with their immediate environs) that were erected and used during the two US wintering expeditions. It has been designated a Historic Site or Monument (HSM 55) following a proposal by the US to the Antarctic Treaty Consultative Meeting (ATCM). The British Station E research station is also considered to be of historical importance in relating to both the early period of exploration and the later BAS history of the 1960s and 1970s, and it has been similarly designated a Historic Site or Monument (HSM 64) following a proposal by the United Kingdom to the ATCM.

Significant Events
On 22nd December 2022, two British citizens, Caius and Rosie, traveling on board the expedition cruise ship Greg Mortimer were legally married in a simple ceremony conducted by a Marriage Officer appointed by the Commissioner of the British Antarctic Territory, becoming the first people in history to be married at Stonington Island.

Environment

Climate

Important Bird Area
A circular, 500 ha site on the island has been designated an Important Bird Area (IBA) by BirdLife International because it supports a breeding colony of about 135 pairs of imperial shags.  Other birds breeding at the site include south polar skuas and Antarctic terns.

Features
 Anemometer Hill, northeast of Fishtrap Cove on Stonington Island
 Gull Channel, between Dynamite Island and Stonington Island
 Haulaway Point, midway along the northeast side of Stonington Island
 Mast Hill, about 100 meters from the western end of Stonington Island
 Tragic Corner, a bluff marking the northeast end of Boulding Ridge

See also

 Crime in Antarctica
 Edith Ronne
 List of Antarctic and subantarctic islands
 List of Antarctic field camps
 List of Antarctic research stations

References

External links
Newsreel footage of Stonington Base, 1964

Islands of Graham Land
Fallières Coast
Important Bird Areas of Antarctica
Seabird colonies
Historic Sites and Monuments of Antarctica